The men's triple jump at the 2017 World Championships in Athletics was held at the Olympic Stadium on 7 and 10 August.

Summary
In the first round of the final, Alexis Copello (Azerjaijan) was the first over 17 metres with a jump of 17.16 metres, and Will Claye (USA) took the lead with a 17.54 metre jump. In the second round, Nelson Évora (Portugal) moved into silver medal position, until Christian Taylor (USA) took the lead with a 17.57 metre jump. That lasted until Claye's next jump, 17.63 metres, which Taylor answered with a  effort. None of the leaders were able to improve in the last three rounds. By the end of the competition, three jumpers had jumped 17.16 metres, their places settled by their second best jump, which in the case of Cristian Nápoles (CUB) was another 17.16 metres.

Records
Before the competition records were as follows:

No records were set at the competition.

Qualification standard
The standard to qualify automatically for entry was 16.80 metres.

Schedule
The event schedule, in local time (UTC+1), is as follows:

Results

Qualification
The qualification round took place on 7 August, in two groups, both starting at 18:35. Athletes attaining a mark of at least 17.00 metres ( Q ) or at least the 12 best performers ( q ) qualified for the final. The overall results were as follows:

Final
The final took place on 10 August at 20:20. The results were as follows:

References

Triple jump
Triple jump at the World Athletics Championships